The Nigeria-Cameroon chimpanzee (Pan troglodytes ellioti) is a subspecies of the common chimpanzee which inhabits the rainforest along the border of Nigeria and Cameroon. Male Nigeria-Cameroon chimpanzees can weigh up to 70 kilos with a body length of up to 1.2 metres and a height of 1.3 metres. Females are significantly smaller. Like the nominate subspecies, the Nigeria-Cameroon chimpanzee has been classified as Endangered by the IUCN, indicating a high risk of extinction in the near future.

History

The Nigeria-Cameroon chimpanzee has been classified as the fourth subspecies of chimpanzee since 1997 and is the least studied of these subspecies. Its populations are falling across its limited natural range, with between 3500 and 9000 individuals remaining.

Description
Nigeria-Cameroon chimpanzees weigh around 80 kg for adult males in captivity and 65 kg for adult females in captivity. They stand 1–1.7 m tall when erect.

Subpopulations
The Nigeria-Cameroon chimpanzee is found in:
 Gashaka-Gumti National Park, Nigeria (900–1,000 individuals)
 Ngel Nyaki Forest Reserve, Nigeria
 Banyang-Mbo Wildlife Sanctuary, Cameroon (500–900 or 800–1,450 individuals)
 Ebo Wildlife Reserve, Cameroon (626–1,480 individuals)
 Mbam Djerem National Park, Cameroon (at least 500 individuals)

During a 2006 survey in southwestern Nigeria, the Nigeria-Cameroon chimpanzee was found in Idanre Forest Reserve, Ifon Forest Reserve, Oluwa Forest Reserve, Omo Forest Reserve, Ise Forest Reserve, Ologbo Forest Reserve, and Okomu National Park. Chimpanzees were found in Ondo State, Ekiti State, Edo State, and Ogun State. Later surveys also confirmed that chimpanzees are also present in Akure-Ofosu Forest Reserve. This population is on the verge of extinction due to habitat loss, disease, human activities like hunting. The genetic affiliations of this population are also unclear.

A June 2008 report said the Edumanom Forest Reserve was the last known site for chimpanzees in the Niger Delta.

Habitat
There are also populations that primarily inhabit savanna habitats.

Lifespan
Individuals can live for 40 to 60 years.

Status and conservation
The Nigeria-Cameroon chimpanzee is recognised as the most threatened and least widely distributed of all the common chimpanzee subspecies, facing a high likelihood of extinction in the coming decades.

References

Chimpanzees
Mammals of West Africa
Mammals of Cameroon